Two ships of the Royal Australian Navy have been named HMAS Townsville, for the city of Townsville, Queensland.

, a Bathurst-class corvette that was launched in 1941, served until 1946, and was scrapped in 1956
, a Fremantle-class patrol boat launched in 1981, in service until 2007, and preserved as a museum ship

Battle honours
Ships named HMAS Townsville are entitled to carry three battle honours:
Darwin 1942
Pacific 1942–45
New Guinea 1944

References

Royal Australian Navy ship names